Aepli is a surname. Notable people with the surname include:

 Arnold Otto Aepli (1816–1897), Swiss jurist and statesman
 Kurt Aepli (1914–2002), Swiss silversmith and educator

See also
 Aebli